Mansons Landing Water Aerodrome  is located adjacent to Mansons Landing on Cortes Island, British Columbia, Canada.

References

Seaplane bases in British Columbia
Strathcona Regional District
Cortes Island
Registered aerodromes in British Columbia